Naomi Bruderer (born 17 January 1994), known professionally as Naomi Lareine, is a Swiss rhythm and blues singer-songwriter and former footballer who represented Switzerland internationally as a youth.

Career
Discovered by the rapper Noizy, Lareine released her first song, "Sweet Latina", in March 2018. Nine months later, her song "Issa Vibe" was a noted success and allowed her to establish herself in Swiss music. She has collaborated with the rapper Stress and has performed, with him and solo, in major Swiss music festivals, including the Gurtenfestival. In 2019, Swiss Radio chose her as "SRF 3 Best Talent" for her debut EP, "Unchained".

Initially, Lareine's love songs were about boys. But after her first romantic relationship, with a woman, she decided to come out as gay and to write only about women, beginning with "Sweet Latina". She has attributed the success of her songs, in part, to their resulting authenticity.

Personal life
Lareine's family is of Senegalese, Mauritanian and Swiss origin. Her father was a professional ice hockey player. Up until age 19, she played football for Grasshopper Club Zürich and in the Swiss national under-19 football team, then decided to focus on her musical career.

"Naomi Lareine" is a stage name. She was in her mid-twenties as of 2019.

References

External links
 
 Under-17 statistics at Swiss Football Association 
 Under-19 statistics at Swiss Football Association 
 Naomi Bruderer at Soccerdonna.de 

1994 births
Living people
21st-century Swiss women singers
Swiss pop musicians
Rhythm and blues musicians
Swiss songwriters
Swiss lesbian musicians
Swiss LGBT singers
Swiss LGBT songwriters
Lesbian singers
Lesbian songwriters
21st-century Swiss LGBT people
Swiss LGBT sportspeople
LGBT association football players
Swiss women's footballers
Women's association football defenders
Grasshopper Club Zürich (women) players
Swiss Women's Super League players